Bill Orcutt (born February 2, 1962) is an American guitarist and composer whose work combines elements of blues, punk, and free improvisation.

Biography
Inspired by seeing Muddy Waters in The Last Waltz, Orcutt began playing the guitar as a teenager in Miami. In 1992, he formed the band Harry Pussy with his wife, Cuban/American drummer and vocalist Adris Hoyos. The group recorded three LPs and toured the US frequently, often in support of indie bands like Sonic Youth and Sebadoh. Their music, which drew from American no wave, hardcore punk and free jazz was influential and "served as a progenitor for the Noise movement." In 1997 the band dissolved and the couple divorced.

Orcutt moved to San Francisco and took a long hiatus from music, returning in 2009, with an LP of solo guitar entitled A New Way to Pay Old Debts which was well received, ranking third of 2009 in The Wire'''s annual "Rewind" list. His follow-up release How the Thing Sings was similarly praised, reaching number 3 on NPR's The Best Outer Sound Albums of 2011.

Since 2009, Orcutt has toured often appearing at festivals in the US and Europe, including Hopscotch, Incubate, Le Nouveau Festival du Centre Pompidou, Hardly Strictly Bluegrass, Donau and Big Ears. Typically a solo performer, Orcutt has also recorded or performed with Loren Mazzacane Connors, Chris Corsano, Peter Brötzmann and Alan & Richard Bishop.

Discography

Solo
 Untitled (Audible Hiss 1996)
 A New Way to Pay Old Debts (Palilalia 2009, reissued Editions Mego 2011)
 How the Thing Sings (Editions Mego 2011)
 A History of Every One (Editions Mego 2013)
 Solo Acoustic Volume Ten (Vin Du Select Qualitite 2014)
 Bill Orcutt (Palilalia 2017)
 Odds Against Tomorrow (Palilalia 2019)
 Music for Four Guitars'' (Palilalia 2022)

References

External links

 
 
 

American experimental guitarists
American male guitarists
Living people
1962 births
20th-century American guitarists
20th-century American male musicians